The Gantkofel is a mountain of the Nonsberg group in South Tyrol, Italy.

References 
 Alpenverein South Tyrol 

Mountains of the Alps
Mountains of South Tyrol
Nonsberg Group